Sangri County, is a county of Shannan in the Tibet Autonomous Region.

It is home to Wolkha Cholung Monastery, founded as a hermitage in 1393 by Tsongkhapa.

References

External links
 Sangri County Annals
 Olka Choling Monastery

Counties of Tibet
Shannan, Tibet